Novar plc (formerly Caradon plc) was an international building supplies group based in the United Kingdom. Novar was formed in 1921 as Metal Box Company from the coming together of several businesses and trades, including canning and printing. By the 1970s it was a market leader in these fields. In the 1980s the company diversified into building supplies and at its peak consisted of 30 companies supplying products to the construction and DIY industries.

After selling the plumbing parts of the business under the Caradon Brand in 2000 it finally became Novar plc in 2005. It was bought by Honeywell, and its UK business was finally broken up, in effect becoming defunct.

Roots in the printing and canning industries
The canned food industry ("tinning" in the UK) has been used to preserve food for around a century. Before this it was common to buy food either salted, dried or fresh. The industries that produced these cans, or tins, were small and usually family owned, with limited ability to compete with one another because the market was so large.

One of these family can makers was Robert Barclay, who had also owned a printing business since 1855. Barclay was a distant relative of the founders of Barclays Bank and printed cheques for the bank. Eventually he joined his brother-in-law John Fry in forming the company Barclay & Fry where together they worked to develop the technique of offset lithography, with the intention of using this process to print biscuit tin labels.

Decorated tins were highly popular in Great Britain at this time and many homes had large collections of them, but before this process most tins were hand painted.

After Barclay's death this new printing process was be leased to Huntley, Boorne & Stevens, who made biscuit tins for the company Huntley & Palmers and used it to apply labels to their tins. As the tin manufacturing industry grew with this innovation, labour costs became lower, and profits higher, until the Trade Boards Act 1909 was introduced which forced tin manufacturers to improve the conditions and wages for their staff. This caused some of tin manufacturing companies to band together and form a UK Tin Box Makers Union to protect their businesses and its practices.

Founding of Metal Box & Printing Industries
During the First World War the tinning industry saw increased business manufacturing ration tins for British troops. With the UK government placing wartime restrictions on tin, many companies that formed the federation worked closely together, and after the war four of them, Hudson Scott, F. Atkins & Co., Henry Grant & Co., and Barclay & Fry, banded together to form the company Allied Tin Box Makers Limited. Though they were essentially one company, using it to control the market and make acquisitions, each member company still essentially remained private and ran its own affairs. In 1922 they opted to change the company name to Metal Box & Printing Industries after establishing comfortable control of the UK market.

Before long this control was threatened by the import of the American system of semi-automatic can making, which could produce more cans a minute than the British process. The business interests of G. E. Williamson's family, (who had refused to join Allied Tin Box), purchased the new machinery and subsequently earned itself a government contract. Inevitably with this importation of superior production technology, members of the U.S. canning industry quickly expressed a keen interest in the British tin manufacturing market.

American Can Company was the first US company to attempt to establish a foothold in the UK. It did so by purchasing a small company and renaming it the British Can Company. Soon after this it made an attempt to acquire Metal Box, which in an effort to stay independent, arranged a partnership that ensure it remained so, but defined and encouraged its positive growth.

Metal Box then made a deal with American Can's US-based rival firm, Continental Can Company. The two companies agreed to not only exchange stock shares, but the deal also gave Metal Box the exclusive rights in Great Britain to buy machinery, technical support, training, and patents from Continental Can. This deal effectively eliminated their competition as no other UK company existed that was able to compete.

In less than a year after this deal, British Can found itself in dire straits with Metal Box eventually agreeing to purchase it from its parent on one condition: that it agreed to a non-compete clause in Britain and Ireland for the next 21 years.

The Great Depression era and further growth 
Metal Box (unlike its peers) experienced growth during the Great Depression. Smaller can makers  collapsed, allowing the company to purchase them.

Metal Box flourished by selling its acquired technology to its customers and (whilst not wishing to wholly enter the food production market) attempted to increase the public's interest in canned foods by setting up a publicity department.

At this time Continental Can was essentially still Metal Box's main business partner and the two companies essentially divided the world markets between themselves. In the late 1930s, the company planned to upgrade and revolutionise its forms of packaging, however the onset of the Second World War put a halt to all new production.

Tin box factories like Metal Box were requisitioned to produce containers for gas masks for the government, and paint tin manufacturing lines were adapted to make anti-tank mine casings. Once again ration tins were produced alongside shell casings. During this period, Metal Box's profits were noted as having fallen to £242,428 by 1945.

Return to packaging production 
Around 1943, the war began to turn in favour of the allied powers. Metal Box began to look at its packaging, looking toward the use of paper, foil, and plastics in its container manufacturing as the postwar economy boomed. But by the late 1940s the company was hit with a major setback when the United States Department of Justice filed an antitrust suit against the business practices of Continental Can and began to look into its dealings with Metal Box more closely. As a result, the two companies had to modify their agreement in 1950 to restrict their interactions to sharing technology. All mutual ventures and market controls were dissolved. This modified agreement was renewed/expanded in 1970 and was meant to continue through to 1990.

By the 1960s, the company had established itself as the leading supplier of packaging to some of the world's biggest companies having contracts with: Unilever, Heinz, Imperial Chemical Industries (ICI), Imperial Tobacco, British American Tobacco (BAT), Nestlé and Shell. In 1970, it had expanded its product line in Britain to include aerosols, plastic film, engineering and central heating by buying Wallis Tin Stamping, Brown Flexible Packaging and Bibby & Gregory. The company had also expanded its business abroad by establishing facilities or subsidiaries in many countries including: Italy, Malaysia, Japan, and Iran, and had upgraded its older installations in India, South Africa and France. Despite this expansion, Metal Box still conducted most of its business within the UK.

As the 1970s continued, Metal Box's packaging subsidiaries faced increased competition both at home and overseas. The company opened itself up to further competition when, in 1978, it abandoned its licensing deal with Continental Can, which immediately began an attempt to remain in the market by building a two-piece aluminium can plant in Wales. Two-piece cans were considered the most modern technology at the time and whilst dealing with these problems in the UK, Metal Box increasingly looked abroad for growth opportunities.

In 1979 Metal Box also opened its own two-piece can manufacturing plant based in Carson, California, and eventually went on to supply Pepsi-Cola. At this time, Metal Box entered into a licensing agreement with the French company Carnaud, where Metal Box would provide the equipment and expertise necessary to open a two-piece can making plant in Belgium.

The 1980s, recession and re-imagining
Metal Box barely survived the early 1980s; recession and bad management had marred the company as had ever increasing competition in the canned foods market. Eventually, in the mid-1980s, the company hired Brian Smith (the man mostly known for helping to turn around ICI) as chairman, and Murray Stuart was appointed as chief executive.

In 1988 in an effort to de-emphasise the company's roots in the tinning industry, and emphasise its considerable expansion into other fields, the team of Smith and Stuart changed the company's name to MB Group, and continued steadily to grow its operations and make the company Europe's biggest manufacturer of heating radiators via its Stelrad unit.

Also at this time, the company began to develop a bathroom products section via its Stelrad Doulton subsidiary, and in the United States its Clarke Checks subsidiary had grown to become the fourth-largest cheque printer in the US.

In October 1988, MB agreed to merge its packaging division with Carnaud forming CMB Packaging SA becoming the third largest packaging company in the world. Eventually the company beefed up its central heating and bathroom divisions by acquiring Caradon plc and its top brands which at the time included Mira showers and Twyford Bathrooms.

Following this deal, Smith retired leaving the freshly-named MB-Caradon plc in the hands of Murray Stuart. The former Caradon chief Peter Jansen was appointed CEO and the two would merge the acquisitions gained by the purchase of Caradon into its existing Stelrad brand.

1990s and decline 
In April 1993, MB-Caradon sold its stake in CMB (which was, at the time, called Carnaud-Metalbox) finally shedding itself of the roots that it had tried so hard to disassociate itself with since the early 1980s. After acquiring RTZ Pillar it changed its name to Caradon plc. The following year Caradon acquired a 43% stake of the company Weru A.G., which at the time was the top manufacturer of doors and windows in Germany.

In response, in late 1995, Jansen restructured the company axing 1,600 jobs and a layer of management. In 1996, 18 of its businesses were sold.

Sale, closure, and aftermath
Caradon Plumbing Solutions was bought by HSBC Private Equity on 9 October 2000 for £442 million,

From this sale Caradon Stelrad plc was formed from both the Stelrad radiators and Ideal Boilers subsidiaries by a group consisting of BNP Paribas and the Royal Bank of Scotland (RBS). The bathroom division, Twyford Bathrooms, was sold to Finnish company the Sanitec Group in January 2001 for £84 million. On 19 July 2001 Mira Showers and Alstone shower cubicles were also sold to the Kohler Company for £301 million forming Kohler Mira Ltd.

In 2013 Caradon Stelrad was renamed Ideal Stelrad Group and purchased by Bregal Capital, after BNP Paribas decided to sell its stake. The deal went against the wishes of the Royal Bank of Scotland which held a 15% equity stake in Ideal Stelrad and had advised the company to offer up its two operating divisions in separate sales.

This eventually came to fruition, however when the Ideal Boilers side of the company was sold by Bregal Capital to Groupe Atlantic in 2015 it effectively split the group. Stelrad continues to use the name Ideal Stelrad Group and market Ideal Boilers on its website.

With the sale of the Caradon side of the business the company elected to focus on its US interests and changed its name to Novar plc.

in 2004 Melrose Industries made a hostile bid for the company, they eventually withdrew after a counter-bid was placed by Honeywell in 2005.

Honeywell broke up the company effectively ending its UK business operations and making it defunct. The name does still exist in the US as Novar Controls (operating as just Novar as of 2017), a manufacturing company formed in 1964, based in Cleveland, Ohio, which develops technology to centrally control and manage HVAC, refrigeration and lighting systems for businesses, using direct digital control and energy management.

References

Further reading 
 Reader, W. J., Metal Box: A History, London: Heinemann, 1976.
 Foster, Geoffrey, "The Remaking of Metal Box", Management Today, January 1985, pp. 43–51.
 "Up Packaging Interests with Carnaud", Times (London), 27 October 1988, p. 25.
 "Metal Box Aims to Kick Continental Can", World Business Weekly, 1 September 1980, pp. 10–11.
 Oates, David, "Metal Box Re-Packages Its Operations," International Management, May 1976, pp. 10–13
 Urry, Maggie, "Bold Deal Soothes Anxious Onlookers," Financial Times, 26 August 1993, p. 19.

British companies established in 1985
Electronics companies of the United Kingdom
Honeywell
Companies formerly listed on the London Stock Exchange
Aluminium companies of the United Kingdom